The Barrow Point or Mutumui language, called Eibole, is a recently extinct Australian Aboriginal language. According to Wurm and Hattori (1981), there was one speaker left at the time.

Phonology

References

Further reading
 John Haviland and Roger Hart's Old Man Fog and the Last Aborigines of Barrow Point, a novel about the efforts of Hart, a native of the Cape York peninsula, to record and preserve Barrow Point language and culture.

Paman languages
Extinct languages of Queensland
Yalanjic languages